The Cooloola sedge frog or Cooloola tree frog (Litoria cooloolensis) is a species of frog in the subfamily Pelodryadinae. 

It is endemic to Australia and only known from Fraser and North Stradbroke Islands, off south-eastern Queensland.

Habitat 
It inhabits sandy coastal and island freshwater lakes and wallum creeks, with a preference for dense reed beds. It is threatened by water extraction and pollution and by tramping of the reef beds. It occurs in the Great Sandy National Park.

Description 
This amphibian's back is yellowish green, speckled with dark spots, and the hidden surfaces of its thighs are orange with a purple-brown stripe. The belly is grainy and white in color.

L. cooloolensis, like other members of the genus Litoria, has horizontal irises.

Taxonomy 
Litoria cooloolensis is part of the species-group L. bicolor, which was created to accommodate 7 species from the region that had characteristics in common.

The other members of the group are: Litoria fallax in Australia; Litoria bicolor in Austrália and Papua New Guine; Litoria bibonius, Litoria contrastens, Litoria longicrus and Litoria mystax in Papua New Guine.

References

Litoria
Frogs of Australia
Endemic fauna of Australia
Amphibians of Queensland
Amphibians described in 1974
Taxonomy articles created by Polbot